Ben Grossman is a Canadian hurdy-gurdy player, percussionist, composer and improviser. He performs both as a soloist and as part of various ensembles. Ben's work is featured on over 80 CDs. He has also been recorded for film soundtracks, radio dramas, as well as for television shows and commercials.

Grossman was part of the music team awarded the 2005 Golden Sheaf Award in the  Best Original Music Non-Fiction category for the Ali Kazimi film, Continuous Journey. He has performed live with the Toronto Consort, Ensemble Polaris, La Nef, BT, Loreena McKennitt, (amongst others) and in various solo and ensemble improvisational events. Grossman's first solo album, Macrophone was released in 2007 and features a unique two CD form for simultaneous, aleatoric playback.

Grossman has presented hurdy-gurdy workshops and lessons with Valentin Clastrier, Matthias Loibner, Maxou Heintzan, and Simon Wascher. He currently focuses on his efforts in applying the hurdy-gurdy to early, traditional, experimental and ambient music. His goal is to explore the wide range of sound possibilities of this acoustic synthesizer.

Discography
Solo
Macrophone (2007)
Live at the Guelph Jazz Festival (recorded 2012, released 2019)
With Loreena McKennitt
A Midwinter Night's Dream (2008)
A Mediterranean Odyssey (2009)The Wind That Shakes the Barley'' (2010)

References

Living people
Year of birth missing (living people)
Hurdy-gurdy players
20th-century Canadian multi-instrumentalists
Canadian folk musicians
Canadian experimental musicians
21st-century Canadian multi-instrumentalists
Canadian percussionists
21st-century Canadian composers
20th-century Canadian composers